Amnour Assembly constituency is an assembly constituency in Saran district in the Indian state of Bihar.

Overview
As per Delimitation of Parliamentary and Assembly constituencies Order, 2008, No. 120 Amnour Assembly constituency  is composed of the following: Amnour and Maker community development blocks; Sobhepur, Pachrukhi, Bheldi, Pachalakh, Chandpura and Saguni gram panchayats of Parsa CD Block.

Amnour Assembly constituency  is part of No. 20 Saran (Lok Sabha constituency).

In 2015 Bihar Legislative Assembly election, voters of Chandila village of Maker block in Amnour Assembly constituency completed boycotted the polling and no votes was cast in protest against the government's failure to bring electricity to their village.

Members of Legislative Assembly

Election results

2020

References

External links
 

Assembly constituencies of Bihar
Politics of Saran district